WOMAD (World of Music, Arts and Dance) is an international arts festival. The central aim of WOMAD is to celebrate the world's many forms of music, arts and dance.

History
WOMAD was founded in 1980 by English rock musician Peter Gabriel, with Thomas Brooman, Bob Hooton, Mark Kidel, Stephen Pritchard, Martin Elbourne and Jonathan Arthur. Original designers were Steve Byrne and Valerie Hawthorn. The first WOMAD festival was in Shepton Mallet, UK in 1982. The audience saw Peter Gabriel, Don Cherry, The Beat, Drummers of Burundi, Echo & The Bunnymen, Imrat Khan, Prince Nico Mbarga, Peter Hammill, Simple Minds, Suns of Arqa, The Chieftains and Ekome National Dance Company, founded by Barrington, Angie, Pauline and Lorna Anderson, the pioneering African arts company in the UK amongst others performing.

Gabriel and his company, which had funded WOMAD, faced financial ruin from high costs of the festival in its very first year, worsened by the lack of suitable transport to the venue (Shepton Mallet Showground) and a lack of publicity. At the suggestion of Tony Smith, the manager of Gabriel and Genesis, he and the remaining members of Genesis agreed to play together for a single show under the name Six of the Best at Milton Keynes. This performance included a dynamic inclusion of Ekome National Dance Company, fusing live African Drum on Peter Gabriel's track "Rhythm of the Heat". The show rescued the company and made it possible for further WOMAD events to take place.

Since 1982, WOMAD Festivals have travelled all over the world, bringing artists to 27 countries and entertaining over one million people. The main UK event settled at Rivermead in Reading, Berkshire, from 1990 until 2006. Before moving to its present home in Charlton Park, Wiltshire from 2007.

In 2017 WOMAD UK marked its 35th anniversary. Headliners Emir Kusturica & The No Smoking Orchestra, Toots and The Maytals, and Roy Ayers, Seun Kuti & Egypt 80 along with 30 other artists performed for a record-setting audience for the festival of 40,000 people.

In 2022, after two forced cancellations due to the Covid-19 pandemic the UK festival returned for its 40th anniversary.  Peter Gabriel appeared on stage with Friday night headliner Angelique Kidjo as well as introducing Osibisa on stage on Saturday afternoon.  Other headliners included The Flaming Lips, Fatoumata Diawara & Lianne La Havas.  Other keys acts across the weekend on other stages included Kae Tempest, Kanda Bongo Man, Gilberto Gil, The Selector and Les Amazones d'Afrique.

Festival recordings
A triple album was released in 2007 to make the 35th anniversary of WOMAD featuring recordings from many of the festivals in the UK and other sites across the world.

Various other Real World Records albums feature recordings from the 1982, 1988, 1996 and 2002 UK festivals.

Artists such as 23 Skidoo, Sons of Arqa, Echo & The Bunnymen and Tankus The Henge have released recordings from the UK festivals.

For the 40th anniversary of the first UK festival in 2022 Real World Records released the Live at WOMAD 1982 double album on CD, vinyl and download featuring mostly previously unreleased recordings from the very first UK festival. The CD included two bonus songs. The vinyl included a replica of the original poster.

Ethos
From the outset, the WOMAD name has reflected the festival's idea; to be embracing but non-definitive, inspiring and outward looking; and more than anything, enthusiastic about a world that has no boundaries in its ability to communicate through music and movement.

Programming
WOMAD has always presented music that they felt to be of excellence, passion and individuality, regardless of musical genre or geographical origin. WOMAD encourages collaboration amongst the artists they invite to perform. The first WOMAD Festival in 1982 had Echo and the Bunnymen join forces with the Drummers of Burundi, and WOMAD Abu Dhabi 2010, saw a collaboration between Tinariwen, TV on the Radio members Kyp Malone and Tunde Adebimpe, Grammy-winning producer Ian Brennan (music producer, author), and the French Algerian Mehdi from Speed Caravan.

Workshops. Adult workshops are taken by the musicians and will involve dance, musical instruments and discussions. Children's workshops involve painting, circus skills, graffiti, modelling, story telling and more.
Taste The World. Musicians cook a choice of dish from their home country in front of an audience.
Global Market. The Global Market sells international food and wares.

UK location
WOMAD in the UK takes place in the grounds of Charlton Park, a stately home in Wiltshire. The arena holds at least 5 main stages with a further one in the Arboretum. An old fashioned steam fair, global market, children's area, wellbeing section is also found on the WOMAD UK festival site.
WOMAD Charlton Park falls on the last complete weekend in July. In 2019 the capacity of the festival was 40,000.

Previous UK locations

After the debut 1982 performance at the Bath & West Showground the festival took a sabbatical.  There were some WOMAD events in 1983 at the ICA in London as part of a collaboration with Capital Radio Festival to see if there was still an audience for the brand.

1985 saw the festival move to Mersea Island in Essex with New Order, The Fall, Toots & The Maytals, Nusrat Fateh Ali Khan, The Pogues, A Certain Ratio and Penguin Cafe Orchestra performing amongst others.  (A section of Nusrat's performance was released on CD in 2019).

1986 the festival moved to Kenn Pier Farm, Clevedon, Somerset and saw performances from Gil Scott-Heron, Misty In Roots, Siouxsie & The Banshees, The Housemartins, Youssou N'Dour, The Bhundu Boys, Aswad, Hugh Masekela, 23 Skidoo and The Blue Aeroplanes amongst many others 19–20 July.

In 1987 WOMAD hosted the new world-music-focused third stage at Glastonbury Festival that went on to be called The Jazz World (and later, West Holts) stage.  1987 also saw the first of the WOMAD weekenders in Carlyon Bay, Cornwall (The Coliseum) that ran annually until 1993.  (The Durutti Column released recordings from their performance here in the late 1980s).

There was a folk & blues WOMAD event in 1988 at the South Hill Park Arts Centre in Bracknell. (A recording from this event was later released on CD).

1989 to 1997 WOMAD weekender events were held in Morecambe Bay, Lancashire so that the brand weren't accused of being "southern-centric".

1990-2006 The Rivermead Centre (and later Little John's Farm), Reading, Berkshire was the permanent WOMAD UK festival home before the festival moved to its current home in Wiltshire due to needing to expand, by the time the festival had expanded and needed to move there were three stages: The Open Air, Siam and Village. (Recordings exist from several of the events).   1988 saw the Siam Tent first introduced.

2003-2005 saw additional events at The Eden Project, including a special Live 8 performance (released on CD & DVD).
Fri 22/08/2003: 
Eden Arena:
Afro Celt Sound System
Los De Abajo
Chico Cesar
Humid & Tropical Biomes & The Indigo Tent:
The Patrick Duff Band
Madosini & Vuyo
Patrick Duff, Madosini & Vuyo
The Dhol Foundation
Chartwell Dutiro
Gwenno
The Link Building:
1 Giant Leap
Pathaan
DJ Desperado
Fri 27/08/2003:
"A SUMMERS NIGHT OF MUSIC"
SHOW OF HANDS (UK)
SUSANA BACA (Peru), THE CAT EMPIRE (Australia)
ASERE (Cuba)
LAYE SOW (Senegal)
DREAMCATCHER (UK)
DREADZONE SOUND SYSTEM (UK)
CHARLIE GILLETT (UK)
Sat 02/07/2005
"Live 8 - Africa Calling"
Hosted by Peter Gabriel and Youssou N'dour
Angelique Kidjo
Maryam Mursal
Salif Keita
Thomas Mapfumo & the Blacks Unlimited
Tinariwen
Daara J
Akim El Sikameya
Shikisha
Ayub Ogada
Modou Diouf & O Fogum

WOMAD came to Bristol Zoo in 2011, with a subsequent event in 2012. A boycott of the 2012 event was called for by the Captive Animals Protection Society because of concerns that noise from the festival could affect the animals' welfare.
2011 event (£20 adults over 15, children 3-14 £5, under 3 free):
Biram Seck, Gabby Young and Other Animals, Muntu Valdo, Rua MacMillan, Siyaya, The Magic Tombolinos
2012 event (same prices):
Ballet Nimba, Jaipur Kawa Brass Band, Perunika, Ska Cubano, Spiro, The Boxettes
2013 event (£17.50 for adults this year):
Diabel Cissokho, Katy Carr & the Aviators, Sarah Savoy and the Francadians, The Dhol Foundation, The Barons of Tang.
(Radio Womad were also present at all three Bristol Zoo events).

2022 saw a free WOMAD commissioned event at the South Bank Centre featuring an hour long performance by Yazz Ahmed.

Reading Highlights

2001

Friday
- Soweto String Quartet (South Africa)
- Kazufumi 'Echo' Kodama (Japan)
- Mabulu (Mozambique)
- Asian Dub Foundation (UK)
- Ballet Folklorico Cutumba (Santiago de Cuba)
- Rachid Taha (Algeria)
- Joji Hirota & the London Metropolitan Ensemble (Japan/UK)
- Dounia (Sicily)
- Paul James & Mark Hawkins (UK)
Saturday
- Siyaya (Zimbabwe)
- Tarras (UK)
- Hamid Baroudi (Algeria)
- Oliver Mutukudzi & The Black Spirits (Zimbabwe)
- Kazufumi 'Echo' Kodama (Japan)
- Imbizo with special guests Nuclearte (Zimbabwe/Sicily)
- Cecile Kayirebwa (Rwanda)
- Jose Merce (Spain)
- Juan de Marcos' Afro-Cuban All Stars (Cuba)
- Modou Diouf & Beugue Djamm (Senegal)
- Cachaito Lopez (Cuba)
- Cheikh Lo (Senegal)
- Dounia (Sicily)
- Whirl-Y-Gig
Sunday
- Regis Gizavo (Madagascar)
- Orchestre National de Barbes (Magreb/France)
- Shilpi Baruri
- Badenya les Freres Coulibaly (Burkina Faso)
- Danza Libre (Cuba)
- Hamid Baroudi (Algeria)
- Badejo Arts (Nigeria)
- Trilok Gurtu (India)
- Oliver Mutukudzi & The Black Spirits (Zimbabwe)
- Siyaya (Zimbabwe)
- Mushtaq (UK)
- Whirl-Y-Gig

2002
Abdelkader Saadoun (Algeria/UK); Anouskha Shankar (India); Bob Brozman/Rene Lacaille/Takashi Hirayasu (USA/New Guinea Islands/Japan); Cara Dillon (UK); Ernest Ranglin (Jamaica); Francis Dunnery (UK); Gigi (Ethiopia); Issa Bagayogo (Mali); Lokua Kanza (Zaire); Los De Abajo (Mexico); Pina (Austria); Rachid Taha (Algeria); Rebecca Malope (South Africa); Ronu Majumdar Trio with special guest Trilok Gurtu (India); Souad Massi (Algeria); Tartit Ensemble (Mali) and Trio Mocoto (Brazil); Adrian Sherwood (UK); Bill Cobham (USA); Asere (Cuba); The Bisserov Sisters (Bulgaria); Misty In Roots (UK); Orchestra Baobab (Senegal); Papa Noel & Papi Oviedo (Congo); King Wasiu Ayinde Marshall (Nigeria); Kanda Bongo Man (Congo); The Walkabouts (USA); and The Shrine (UK); System 7 (UK)

2003
Friday 25 July
1 Giant Leap (UK) with special guest appearances from Baaba Maal (Senegal) and Maxi Jazz (UK); Amampondo (South Africa), Amjad Ali Khan (India); Bembeya Jazz (Guinea); Celloman (UK); Chico César (Brazil); Dan Hicks and the Hot Licks (USA); Eliza Carthy Big Band (England); Joji Hirota and Taiko Drummers (Japan/UK); Julien Jacob (Benin/West Indies/France); McKay (USA); Modeste Hugues (Madagascar); Pape & Cheikh (Senegal); Sevara Nazarkhan (Uzbekistan); Sotho Sounds (Lesotho) and The Suspects - Soul 'n' Rhythm Revue (UK). CLUB WOMAD - DJ Gilles Peterson (UK); The Cat Empire (Australia) and DJ Desperado (UK). KITTY CANDLE'S CABARET - Clive Andrews (Australia); Stretch People (UK); Heir of Insanity (UK); Martinez and Fabriga(UK); Woody Bop Muddy (UK) and Les Goulus (France).

Saturday 26 July
Ali Slimani (Algeria/UK); Amampondo (South Africa); Asad Qizilbash (Pakistan); Clave y Guaguancó (Cuba); Dan Hicks and the Hot Licks (USA); Jimmy Cliff (Jamaica); JJC and the 419 Squad (UK/Nigeria); Julien Jacob (Benin/WestIndies/France); Liam Gerner (Australia); Lo'Jo (France); Nitin Sawhney (UK); Pape & Cheikh (Senegal); Samba Sunda (Java); Super Rail Band of Bamako (Mali); Temple of Sound (UK): Teofilo Chantre (Cap Verde) and The Cat Empire (Australia). CLUB WOMAD - DJ Mr Scruff (UK) and Homelife (UK). KITTY CANDLE'S CABARET - Clive Andrews (Australia); Stretch People (UK); Heir of Insanity (UK); Martinez & Fabriga (UK); Woody Bop Muddy (UK)and Les Goulus (France).

Sunday 27 July
Asad Qizilbash (Pakistan); Claude Chaloub & special guest Ronu Majumdar (Lebanon/India); Ensemble Kaboul (Afghanistan); Errol Linton's Blues Vibe (UK); Kad Achouri (France/Spain/Algeria); Khaled (Algeria); Manecas Costa (Guinea Bissau); Manu Dibango & Ray Lema (Cameroon/Democratic Republic of Congo); Ojos de Brujo (Spain); Oumou Sangare (Mali); Rodrigo and Gabriela (Mexico); Sevara Nazarkhan (Uzbekistan); Sierra Maestra (Cuba); Super Rail Band of Bamako (Mali); The Angel Brothers & Satnam Singh (UK/India); The Proclaimers (Scotland) and Totonho y Os Cabra (Brazil). CLUB WOMAD - Future World Funk (UK); Pardesi Music Machine (UK) and Pathaan (UK). KITTY CANDLE'S CABARET - Clive Andrews (Australia); Stretch People (UK); Heir of Insanity (UK); Martinez & Fabriga (UK); Woody Bop Muddy (UK) and Les Goulus (France).

2004
FRIDAY 23 JULY
Andrea Echeverry de Aterciopelados (Colombia); Ceilidh featuring Tiger Moth (UK); David Byrne featuring The Tosca Strings (USA); Dhol Foundation (UK); Fawzy Al-Aiedy (Iraq/France); Golden Pride Children's Choir (Tanzania); Izzi Dunn (UK); Laye Sow (Senegal); Patrick Duff and Alex Webb (UK); Radio Mundial (USA/Puerto Rico); Richard Bona (Cameroon); Sharon Shannon (Ireland); Souad Massi (Algeria); The Drummers of Burundi (Burundi); Yelemba d'Abidjan (Côte d'Ivoire) and Zaman Zaki (Pakistan).
KITTY CANDLE'S CABARET - Les Têtes de Vainqueurs (France); Les Goulus (France); Mimbre (Italy/Sweden); Mr Dennis Teeth (UK); Stickleback Plasticus (UK).
CLUB WOMAD - DJ Andy Kershaw (UK) and JJC & 419 Squad (Nigeria/UK).

SATURDAY 24 JULY
Culture Musical Club - Grand Orchestre Taarab de Zanzibar (Tanzania); Daara J (Senegal); Damien Dempsey (Ireland); Drum Drum (Australia/Papua New Guinea); Golden Pride Children's Choir (Tanzania); Hot Tuna (USA); Imbongi & Albert Nyathi (Zimbabwe); Kila (Ireland); Malouma (Mauritania); Marsada (Sumatra); Michael Messer (UK); Moon Dogs (UK); N'faly Kouyate & Dunyakan (Guinea); Nigel Kennedy and Kroke (UK/Poland); Rokia Traore (Mali); Sidestepper (Colombia/UK); The Drummers of Burundi (Burundi); Tinariwen (Mali); Yair Dalal (Israel); Yelemba d'Abidjan (Côte d'Ivoire) and Zaman Zaki (Pakistan).
KITTY CANDLE'S CABARET - Les Têtes de Vainqueurs (France); Les Goulus (France); Mimbre (Italy/Sweden); Mr Dennis Teeth (UK); Stickleback Plasticus (UK).
CLUB WOMAD - The Bays (UK), Future World Funk (UK) and Resin Dogs (Australia).

SUNDAY 25 JULY
Aayjemaal (Turkmenistan); Amparanoia (Spain); Antonio Forcione & Ronu Majumdar (Italy/India); Ba Cissoko (Guinea); Daby Toure (Mauritania); DJ Dolores & Aparelhagem (Brazil); Enzo Avitabile & Bottari (Italy); Jim Moray (England); Liu Fang (China); Ljiljana Buttler & Mostar Sevdah Reunion (Bosnia); Luciano (Jamaica); Señor Coconut (Germany/Denmark/Venezuela); The Suspects Soul 'n' Rhythm Revue (UK); Wire Daisies (UK) and a Gala performance with Yair Dalal featuring Jim Moray, Liu Fang, N'faly Kouyate with Dunyakan, Chris Difford, Jorma Kaukonen, Jack Casady & Barry Mitterhof.
KITTY CANDLE'S CABARET - Les Têtes de Vainqueurs (France); Les Goulus (France); Mr Dennis Teeth (UK); Stickleback Plasticus (UK); Tuyo (Cuba/UK).
CLUB WOMAD - artists soon to be announced.
KID'S PROCESSION - including work by WOMAD's 2004 resident visual artists The Mora Brothers from Cuba.

Charlton Park Highlights

2007
The first year on the new site was also a very rainy and muddy year with festival goers nicknaming the site "WOMUD".

2008
Due to the previous year's flooding and some inaccessibility, the site was moved around and expanded.  Stages included: Open Air, Siam Tent, Big Red Tent, Little Sicily, Dance Tent, Drum Tent, BBC Radio 3 Stages & Taste The World Stage. Also, the first year Radio Womad broadcast was launched.

2012

Capacity is nearly doubled to 40,000

2013
The headliners appearing on the Open Air and Siam Tent were Gilberto Gil, Rokia Traore, Seun Kuti and Lee "Scratch" Perry with Max Romeo (replaced Toots and the Maytals) Arrested Development were also added to the line-up later on

Adjágas (Norway)
Alice Russell (dropped out) Replaced by DJ Cheeba (UK)
Amesmalua (Spain)
Asif Ali Khan (Pakistan)
Bwani Junction (UK)
Canzoniere Grecanico Salentino (Italy)
Carminho (Portugal)
Christine Salem (Reunion)
David Rodigan MBE (UK)
David Wax Museum (USA)
Debapriya & Samanwaya (India)
Dizu Plaatjies and the Ibuyambo Ensemble (South Africa)
Dub Inc (France)
Emel Mathlouthi (Tunisia)
Fanfare Ciocarlia (Romania)
Fimber Bravo (Trinidad & Tobago)
Flavia Coelho( Brazil)
Fredy Massamba (Congo)
GOCOO (Japan)
Hidden Orchestra (UK)
Huun-Huur-Tu (Russia)
Iadoni (Georgia)
Jagwa Music (Tanzania)
Jesca Hoop (USA)
Katy Carr & The Aviators (UK/Poland)
Kissmet (India)
La Chiva Gantiva (Colombia/Belgium/Vietnam/France)
Le Vent Du Nord (Canada)
Lévon Minassian (Armenia)
Mala in Cuba (UK)
Malawi Mouse Boys (Malawi)
Malouma (Mauritania)
Mohammad Reza Mortazavi (Iran)
Mokoomba (Zimbabwe)
Nano Stern (Chile)
Ondatrópica (Colombia)
Parov Stelar Band (Austria)
Riot Jazz Brass Band (UK)
Sam Lee and Friends (UK)
Schlachthofbronx (Germany)
Spoek Mathambo (South Africa)
Steve Riley & the Mamou Playboys (USA)
Syd Arthur (UK)
Tamikrest (Mali)
The Bombay Royale (India/Australia)
The Heavy (UK)
Urna & Kroke (Mongolia/Poland)

BBC Radio 3 Stage:

Mavrika (Greece)
Barrule (Isle of Man)
Family Atlantica (Ghana)
Lucas Santtana (Brazil)
Zykopops (Croatia)
Roopa Panesar (United Kingdom)
Imperial Tiger Orchestra (Switzerland)
Reverend Peyton's Big Damn Band (United States)
DJ Tudo e sua gente de todo lugar (Brazil)
La Pegatina (Spain)
Fidan Hajieva (Azerbaijan)
Guy Schalom & The Baladi Blues (Egypt)
DaWangGang (China (People's Republic))
KonKoma (Ghana)
Red Hot Chilli Pipers (Scotland)

2014
The 2014 headliners included Youssou N'Dour, Sinead O'Connor, Manu Dibango and Les Ambassadeurs. Sinead O'Connor replaced Bobby Womack, who had died a handful of weeks before the festival. She dedicated her performance to him.

2020
WOMAD UK cancelled due to the COVID-19 pandemic. The festival, Radio Womad and BBC Radio 3 run a free on-line only "WOMAD at Home" event the same weekend with exclusive and archive performances. Also, Will Lawton and the Alchemists gain permission to access the site and recorded a short two song set and are "The only band to play WOMAD 2020", with the video and images being released via their Facebook and Instagram accounts.  "WOMAD at Home" T-shirts are sold to help raise funds for the festival crews affected by the forced unemployment.

2021
WOMAD UK cancelled again. Radio WOMAD again broadcast exclusive live shows from the presenters respective homes over the weekend.

2022
40th anniversary festival.

A Certain Ratio
Abel Selaocoe
Adg7
Alban Claudin
Angelique Kidjo (Peter Gabriel performed on the encore with her)
B.Dance
Bab'bluz
Barmer Boys
Bess Atwell
Cimafunk
Dizraeli
DJ Alikat
DJ Chris Tofu And Fizzy Gillespie
DJ Sacha Dieu
Dudu Tassa And The Kuwaits
Elaha Soroor And Kefaya Electric Jalaba
Fantastic Negrito
Father of Mylo
Fatoumata Diawara 
Fulu Miziki Kollectiv
Future Shape of Sound
Gilberto Gil & Family
Gonne Choi
Greentea Peng (cancelled just prior to the festival) 
Grupo Lokito
Guo Yue & Joji Hirota & members of the London Taiko Drummers
Gwenifer Raymond
Hatis Noit
Hollie Cook
Isona job artgheh
Jack Baldus
Jali Bakary Konteh & The Minyanta Band
Joe Armon-Jones
Joseph Tawadros
Johanna Juhola Reaktori
JSSO Project
Kae Tempest
Kampire
Kanda Bongo Man
Khiyo
King Pleasure and the Biscuit Boys (cancelled during the festival)
Lazy Habits
Les Amazones d'Afrique
Lianne La Havas
Mariachi Las Adelitas
Mazaher
Minyo Crusaders
Mister Tooley (DJ şet)
Mr Bruce
Nabiyah Iqbal (DJ set)
Nihiloxica
Nitin Sawhney (also hosted a Q&A the day prior)
Nubiyan Twist
Olcay Bayir
Onipa
Osibisa (introduced on stage by Peter Gabriel)
Paolo Tossio
Project Smok
Ram
Ramy Essam
Said Muti
Sam Amidon
Sarathy Korwar
Seed.
Sona Jobarteh
Son Rompe Pera
Soul Professor
Stornoway
Sugarhill Gang & The Furious Five (cancelled prior to the festival)
Taraf De Caliu
The Bandit
The Dhol Foundation
The Flaming Lips
The Fontanas
The Garifuna Collective (cancelled last minute and were replaced by a 2nd performance by Mr. Bruce)
The Hempolics
The Malmesbury Project With Amaraterra
The Mauskovic Dance Band
The Selecter
Too Many T's
Vision Collective
Voka Gentle
Yazz Ahmed
Zed Bias

Worldwide locations
WOMADelaide, Adelaide, South Australia
WOMAD New Plymouth, Taranaki, New Zealand
WOMAD Abu Dhabi, Abu Dhabi, UAE
WOMAD Cáceres, Extremadura, Spain
WOMAD Sicily, Sicily, Italy
WOMAD Las Palmas de Gran Canaria, Canary Islands, Spain
WOMAD Santiago, Chile

WOMAD New Plymouth 2021 was cancelled in 2020 due to COVID-19 pandemic complications; because of New Zealand's social distancing regulations during the emergence of COVID, its local organizing committee argued that the financial risk was too high if restrictions were to potentially be reinstated in close proximity to the event.

Previous Worldwide Locations
WOMAD USA (recordings from this event were released on CD)
WOMAD Finland
WOMAD Portugal
WOMAD South Africa
WOMAD Athens
WOMAD Austria
WOMAD Germany
WOMAD Japan
WOMAD Canada
WOMAD Denmark
WOMAD Russia
WOMAD Turkey
WOMAD Italy
WOMAD Singapore (recordings from these events were released on CD)
WOMAD at the Venice Carnival (recordings from this event were released on CD)

Radio WOMAD

Based on Charlton Park every year since the second year (2008) the UK festival moved there, the official festival radio station is broadcast on a temporary FM licence (usually on 87.7FM) just prior to the festival opening its gates to the public and broadcasts 24 hours a day every day until late Monday after the public gates have closed.  Each year the station hosts several exclusive live sessions and interviews from artists playing at the festival across the weekend.  The FM signal reaches about ten miles away from the festival site.

During the forced cancellations of the festival in 2020 and 2021 the radio station was set up to broadcast remotely from several of the presenter's homes across the UK and was broadcast live via Mixcloud where listeners could also interact with other listeners and the presenters for the "WOMAD at home" events.  The shows showcased several highlights of previous live sessions from their archives.  There was also a special live x-mas show in 2021 and two special live announcement shows in early 2022, to tie in with the line-up announcement from the festival, broadcast from station manager Steve Satan's kitchen.

See also
Real World Records

References

External links

Official WOMAD website
Official WOMADelaide website
Official WOMAD New Zealand website
Official WOMAD Abu Dhabi website 

World music festivals
Peter Gabriel
Music festivals established in 1986